Genevieve Edith Ngo Mbeleck (born 10 March 1993) is a Cameroonian footballer who plays as a midfielder.

Club career
Played for FC Minsk (women) in 2015 and 2016 and played the Champions League with them. Then played for Louves Minproff in Cameroon. In 2017 she signed with Spain's Sporting Huelva.

References

External links 
 

1993 births
Living people
Women's association football midfielders
Cameroonian women's footballers
Cameroon women's international footballers
2015 FIFA Women's World Cup players
2019 FIFA Women's World Cup players
African Games silver medalists for Cameroon
African Games medalists in football
Competitors at the 2015 African Games
Cameroonian expatriate women's footballers
Cameroonian expatriate sportspeople in Belarus
Expatriate women's footballers in Belarus
Cameroonian expatriate sportspeople in Spain
Expatriate women's footballers in Spain
FC Minsk (women) players
20th-century Cameroonian women
21st-century Cameroonian women
Fenerbahçe S.K. women's football players